Zoxazolamine (INN, USAN, BAN) (brand name Contrazole, Deflexol, Flexin, Miazol, Uri-Boi, Zoxamine, Zoxine) is a muscle relaxant that is no longer marketed. It was synthesized in 1953 and introduced clinically in 1955 but was withdrawn due to hepatotoxicity. One of its active metabolites, chlorzoxazone, was found to show less toxicity, and was subsequently marketed in place of zoxazolamine. These drugs activate IKCa channels.

References

Amines
Benzoxazoles
Hepatotoxins
Muscle relaxants
Organochlorides
Withdrawn drugs